Kin Kaung (also spelt King Kaung, born Myo Myint; 21 May 1964 – 22 January 2019) was a renowned Burmese comedian and actor. He debuted as a comedian in the traditional anyeint troupe Mya Ponnama in 1985.

Early life
Kin Kaung was born on 21 May 1964 in Rangoon, Burma. He is the second son of four siblings. After he finished high school, he began studying Burmese at the Yangon University. In his second year, in 1983, he went to the university anyeint to be a slapstick comedian.

Career
In 1985, Kin Kaung became one of the comedians in the anyeint troupe Mya Ponnama, organized by Zaganar whose shows frequently appeared on television. Early on, his artist name was "A Shay Gyi" and eventually changed his name to Kin Kaung.

Kin became a professional famous comedian and actor for many direct-to-videos and films. In 1994, he was more popular in Thaye-Lay-Kaung opera performing together with actor Lwin Moe managed by director Mg Wana.

Kin Kaung and other members of Moe Nat Thuza anyeint troupe, including A Yaing, Phoe Phyu and Nga Pyaw Kyaw, were ubiquitous in the 1990s and 2000s. He also performed as a comedian in other Anyeint troupes, Thee Lay Thee and Say Young Sone. Other contemporary comedians were Po Phyu, Kyaw Htoo, Kutho, Myittar and Zaganar. Throughout his career, he has acted in over 200 films.

Death
He died at Popa in the film shooting on 22 January 2019 at the age of 55.

References

1964 births
2019 deaths
Burmese comedians
Burmese male film actors
21st-century Burmese male actors
People from Yangon